The Free French Naval Forces (or FNFL) were the naval arm of the Free French Forces during the Second World War. They were commanded by Admiral Émile Muselier.

History 

In the wake of the Armistice and the Appeal of 18 June, Charles de Gaulle founded the Free French Forces (Forces Françaises Libres, or FFL), including a naval arm, the "Free French Naval Forces" (Les Forces Navales Françaises Libres, or FNFL). On 24 June 1940, de Gaulle made a separate call specifically to servicemen overseas to join him, and two days later the submarine Narval entered Malta and pledged its allegiance to the FFL. On 30 June, De Gaulle was joined by Vice-Admiral Émile Muselier, who had come from Gibraltar by flying boat. Muselier was the only flag officer of the French Navy to answer the call of De Gaulle.

The French fleet was widely dispersed. Some vessels were in port in France; others had escaped from France to British controlled ports, mainly in Britain itself or Alexandria in Egypt. At the first stage of Operation Catapult, the ships in the British ports of Plymouth and Portsmouth were simply boarded on the night of 3 July 1940. The then-largest submarine in the world, which had sought refuge in Portsmouth in June 1940 following the German invasion of France, resisted the British operation. In capturing the submarine, two British officers and one French sailor were killed. Unwilling to return to occupied France, but likewise reluctant to join de Gaulle, Béarn instead sought harbour in Martinique, her crew showing little inclination to side with the British in their continued fight against the Nazis. Already obsolete at the start of the war, she would remain in Martinique for the next four years, her aircraft rusting in the tropical climate.

As soon as the summer 1940, the submarines Minerve and Junon, as well as four avisos, departed from Plymouth. Towards the end of 1940, the destroyers Le Triomphant and Léopard followed. Le Triomphant sailed for New Caledonia and spent the rest of the war based there and in Australia. The ship saw action in both the Pacific and Indian Oceans.

Civilian vessels and crew also rallied to de Gaulle, starting with four cargo ships in Gibraltar - they would be the beginning of the merchant fleet of the FNFL.

To distinguish the FNFL from the Vichist forces, Vice-Admiral Émile Muselier created the bow flag displaying the French colours with a red Cross of Lorraine, and a cocarde also featuring the Cross of Lorraine for aircraft of the Free French Naval Air Service (Aéronavale Française Libre) and the Free French Air Force (Forces Aériennes Françaises Libres).

The FNFL suffered their first loss when the patrol boat  hit a mine and sank on 7 November 1940 off Plymouth.

Africa 

Soon after the fall of France, Free France was but a government in exile based in England, with no land of its own to speak of and very few land or sea forces. In an attempt to establish his authority on an important French territory, General de Gaulle attempted to rally French West Africa by personally sailing to Dakar with a British fleet which included a few Free French units; at the same time, a cruiser force had been sent by Vichy France to reclaim African territories which had already announced their support to De Gaulle (notably Chad). The resulting Battle of Dakar ended on a Vichyite victory. However, after the occupation of Vichy France by the Germans after the Allied invasion of North Africa in November 1942, French West Africa also eventually joined the Free French.

Role in the French Resistance 
Captain d'Estienne d'Orves attempted to unite the French Resistance, became an inspiring symbol when he was arrested, tortured by the Gestapo and executed.

D-Day: Operation Neptune 

In the summer of 1944, the Invasion of Normandy took place. The FNFL took part in both the naval side of the operations, Operation Neptune, and the landing itself, with the Naval Commandos (Commandos Marine) of Captain Philippe Kieffer, climbing cliffs under fire to destroy German shore batteries.

The ships of the FNFL were deployed off the landing sites :

 Utah Beach: corvettes Aconit and 
 Gold Beach: corvette 
 Juno Beach: frigate ; corvette ; and torpedo boat La Combattante

In addition the obsolete battleship Courbet was scuttled off Arromanches to serve as a breakwater for a Mulberry harbour.

The cruisers Georges Leygues and Montcalm, along with the battleship  provided fire support for the infantry until 10 June.

La Combattante silenced German coastal artillery of Courseulles-sur-Mer. The next day, she started patrolling the English Channel. On 14 July, she ferried General Charles de Gaulle to France.

Pacific War 
Triomphant, under the command of Philippe Auboyneau was transferred to the Pacific theatre of the war, where in February 1942 it took part in the evacuation of European and Chinese civilians and military personnel from Nauru and Ocean Island before an anticipated Japanese invasion. After the rescue, Triomphant then searched for I-21 for a day, but without success.

Technical innovations 
The FNFL also harboured technical innovators, like Captain Jacques-Yves Cousteau, who invented the modern aqua-lung, and Yves Rocard, who helped perfect radar. The aqua-lung became a major improvement for commando operations. However, Jacques Cousteau joined the FNFL only after the liberation of France.  He had spent the entirety of the war in France and developed the aqua-lung in Paris during the German occupation.

Losses 
The merchant fleet of the FNFL suffered heavy casualties, amounting to one quarter of its men.

A number of warships were lost, notably the submarine Surcouf, possibly sunk in a friendly fire incident. Other losses include the destroyers Léopard and La Combattante; the submarine ; the patrol boats Poulmic and Vikings, and the corvettes Mimosa and Alysse.

See also 

 List of submarines of France
 List of ships of the Free French Naval Forces
 List of Escorteurs of the French Navy

References

Further reading
 Paul Auphan and Jacques Mordal, The French Navy in World War II (1976) 

 
 Martin Thomas, "After Mers-el-Kebir: The Armed Neutrality of the Vichy French Navy, 1940-43," English Historical Review (1997) 112#447 pp 643–70 in JSTOR

External links 
  charles-de-gaulle.org
  FNFL
 "HONOR, UNITY, SALVATION" -- FLAGS & ENSIGNS OF FREE FRANCE
 Free French Naval Forces (1940-1944)
  LA MARINE MARCHANDE FNFL

 
Navy